Los Cinco is also the name of the founders of the Mexican American Youth Organization.

Los Cinco (in English: "The Five") is an unofficial collective of Latin American composers living and working in Los Angeles. These composers include: Daniel Catán, Miguel del Águila, Aurelio de la Vega, Enrique González-Medina, and Carlos Rodríquez.

Meant to draw a comparison between this collective and a group of avant-garde Parisian composers active in the 1920s known as "Les Six", the term "Los Cinco" was originally coined by Sean Bradley, an American conductor. Bradley first presented these composers as a collective in public performance, and the label Los Cinco first appeared in print in a Los Angeles Times review dated August 3, 2004.

The music by these composers shares "...certain common features, including a vibrancy of ideas, no fear of sensuality or humor, and an infectious passion."

References

External links
 L.A. Times article where the term "Los Cinco" first appears in print
 More on the web about Sean Bradley
 More on the web about Daniel Catán
 More on the web about Miguel del Águila
 More on the web about Aurelio de la Vega
 More on the web about Enrique González-Medina
 More on the web about Carlos Rodriguez

Musicians from Los Angeles
Music organizations based in the United States
American composers